Calabria is a region in Southern Italy. It is a peninsula bordered by Basilicata to the north, the Ionian Sea to the east, the Strait of Messina to the southwest, which separates it from Sicily, and the Tyrrhenian Sea to the west. Catanzaro is the region's capital, while Reggio Calabria is the most populous city in the region.

Calabria is the birthplace of the term Italy, given to it by the Ancient Greeks which settled in this land starting from the 8th century BC. Thanks to its strategic position in the center of the Mediterranean Sea, the region became the center of Magna Grecia (Greater Greece), with the foundation along its coasts of many Greek city-states (póleis) that remained for centuries among the richest and most culturally advanced of their time. Calabria is where Pythagoras, one of the fathers of Western philosophy, developed and spread his thought. It is also the birthplace of Milo, the greatest champion of the ancient Olympic Games, and the adoptive homeland of Herodotus, one of the greatest historians of all time.

In Roman times it was part of the Regio III Lucania et Bruttii, a region of Augustan Italy. After the Gothic War, it became and remained for five centuries a Byzantine dominion (Duchy of Calabria, later promoted to Theme), fully recovering its Hellenic character on a linguistic, religious and artistic level. Cenobitism flourished, with the rise in the whole peninsula of countless churches, hermitages and monasteries in which multitudes of Basilian monks were dedicated to the transcription of classical and religious texts. The Byzantines introduced the art of silk in Calabria and made it the main silk production area in Europe. In the 11th century, the Norman conquest started a slow process of Latinization.

It is the birthplace of two of the most influential European philosophers of the 16th century, Bernardino Telesio and Tommaso Campanella.

In Calabria there are three historical ethnic minorities: the Griko people, speaking Calabrian Greek (also known as Grecanico), a local variety of the Greek language with some unique and archaic features; the Arbëreshë people, descendants of Albanian refugees who fled Albania between the 14th and the 18th centuries following the Ottoman conquest of the Balkans; the Occitans of Guardia Piemontese, a village founded in the 12th century by Waldensians coming from the Western Alps. This extraordinary linguistic diversity makes the region an object of study for linguists from all over the world.

Three national parks are found in Calabria: the Pollino National Park (which is the largest in the country), the Sila National Park and the Aspromonte National Park. This, combined with a large number of beaches, small villages, archaeological parks and ancient castles, makes the region a tourist destination.

Etymology 
Starting in the third century BC, the name Calabria was originally given to the Adriatic coast of the Salento peninsula in modern Apulia. In the late first century BC this name came to extend to the entirety of the Salento, when the Roman emperor Augustus divided Italy into regions. The whole region of Apulia received the name Regio II Apulia et Calabria. By this time modern Calabria was still known as Bruttium, after the Bruttians who inhabited the region. Later in the seventh century AD, the Byzantine Empire created the Duchy of Calabria from the Salento and the Ionian part of Bruttium. Even though the Calabrian part of the duchy was conquered by the Longobards during the eighth and ninth centuries AD, the Byzantines continued to use the name Calabria for their remaining territory in Bruttium.

The modern name Italy derives from Italia, which was first used as a name for the southern part of modern Calabria. Over time the Greeks started to use it for the rest of the southern Italian peninsula as well. After the Roman conquest of the region, the name was used for the entire Italian peninsula and eventually the Alpine region too.

Geography 

Some 42% of Calabria's area, corresponding to 15,080 km2, is mountainous, 49% is hilly, while plains occupy only 9% of the region's territory. It is surrounded by the Ionian and Tyrrhenian seas. It is separated from Sicily by the Strait of Messina, where the narrowest point between Capo Peloro in Sicily and Punta Pezzo in Calabria is only .

Three mountain ranges are present: Pollino, La Sila and Aspromonte, each with its own flora and fauna. The Pollino Mountains in the north of the region are rugged and form a natural barrier separating Calabria from the rest of Italy. Parts of the area are heavily wooded, while others are vast, wind-swept plateaus with little vegetation. These mountains are home to a rare Bosnian Pine variety and are included in the Pollino National Park, which is the largest national park in Italy, covering 1,925.65 square kilometres.

The highest point is Botte Donato, which reaches . The area boasts numerous lakes and dense coniferous forests. The Sila National Park is also known to have the purest air in Europe.

The Aspromonte massif forms the southernmost tip of the Italian peninsula bordered by the sea on three sides.

Most of the lower terrain in Calabria has been agricultural for centuries, and exhibits indigenous scrubland as well as introduced plants such as the prickly pear cactus. The lowest slopes are rich in vineyards and orchards of citrus fruit, including the Diamante citron. Further up, olives and chestnut trees appear while in the higher regions there are often dense forests of oak, pine, beech and fir trees.

Climate 
Calabria's climate is influenced by the sea and mountains. The Mediterranean climate is typical of the coastal areas with considerable differences in temperature and rainfall between the seasons, with an average low of  during the winter months and an average high of  during the summer months. Mountain areas have a typical mountainous climate with frequent snow during winter. The erratic behavior of the Tyrrhenian Sea can bring heavy rainfall on the western slopes of the region, while hot air from Africa makes the east coast of Calabria dry and warm. The mountains that run along the region also influence the climate and temperature of the region. The east coast is much warmer and has wider temperature ranges than the west coast. The geography of the region causes more rain to fall along the west coast than that of the east coast, which occurs mainly during winter and autumn and less during the summer months.

Below are the two extremes of climate in Calabria, the warm mediterranean subtype on the coastline and the highland climate of Monte Scuro.

Geology 

Calabria is commonly considered part of the "Calabrian Arc", an arc-shaped geographic domain extending from the southern part of the Basilicata Region to the northeast of Sicily, and including the Peloritano Mountains (although some authors extend this domain from Naples in the north to Palermo in the southwest). The Calabrian area shows basement (crystalline and metamorphic rocks) of Paleozoic and younger ages, covered by (mostly Upper) Neogene sediments. Studies have revealed that these rocks comprise the upper part of a pile of thrust sheets which dominate the Apennines and the Sicilian Maghrebides.

The Neogene evolution of the Central Mediterranean system is dominated by the migration of the Calabrian Arc to the southeast, overriding the African Plate and its promontories.) The main tectonic elements of the Calabrian Arc are the Southern Apennines fold-and-thrust belt, the "Calabria-Peloritani", or simply Calabrian block and the Sicilian Maghrebides fold-and-thrust belt. The foreland area is formed by the Apulia Platform, which is part of the Adriatic Plate, and the Ragusa or Iblean Platform, which is an extension of the African Plate. These platforms are separated by the Ionian Basin. The Tyrrhenian oceanized basin is regarded as the back-arc basin. This subduction system therefore shows the southern plates of African affinity subducting below the northern plates of European affinity.

The geology of Calabria has been studied for more than a century. The earlier works were mainly dedicated to the evolution of the basement rocks of the area. The Neogene sedimentary successions were merely regarded as "post-orogenic" infill of "neo-tectonic" tensional features. In the course of time, however, a shift can be observed in the temporal significance of these terms, from post-Eocene to post-Early Miocene to post-middle Pleistocene.

The region is seismically active and is generally ascribed to the re-establishment of an equilibrium after the latest (mid-Pleistocene) deformation phase. Some authors believe that the subduction process is still ongoing, which is a matter of debate.

History 

Calabria has one of the oldest records of human presence in Italy, which date back to around 700,000 BC when a type of Homo erectus evolved leaving traces around coastal areas. During the Paleolithic period Stone Age humans created the "Bos Primigenius", a figure of a bull on a cliff which dates back around 12,000 years in the Romito Cave in the town of Papasidero. When the Neolithic period came the first villages were founded around 3,500 BC.

Antiquity
Around 1500 BC a tribe called the Oenotri ("vine-cultivators"), settled in the region. According to Greek mythology, they were Greeks who were led to the region by their king, Oenotrus. The Greeks used the term 'italoi', which according to some ancient Greek writers was derived from a legendary king of the Oenotri, Italus and according to others from the bull. Originally the Greeks used 'italoi' to indicate Calabrians and later it became synonymous with the rest of the peninsula. Calabria therefore was the first region to be called Italia (Italy).

During the eighth and seventh centuries BC, Greek settlers founded many colonies (settlements) on the coast of southern Italy (Magna Grecia). In Calabria they founded Chone (Pallagorio), Cosentia (Cosenza), Clampetia (Amantea), Scyllaeum (Scilla), Sybaris (Sibari), Hipponion (Vibo Valentia), Locri Epizefiri (Locri), Kaulon (Monasterace), Krimisa (Cirò Marina), Kroton (Crotone), Laüs (comune of Santa Maria del Cedro), Medma (Rosarno), Metauros (Gioia Tauro), Petelia (Strongoli), Rhégion (Reggio Calabria), Scylletium (Borgia), Temesa (Campora San Giovanni), Terina (Nocera Terinese), Pandosia (Acri) and Thurii, (Thurio, comune of Corigliano Calabro).

Rhegion was the birthplace of one of the famed nine lyric poets, Ibycus. Metauros was the birthplace of another of the nine lyric poets, Stesichorus, who was the first lyric poet of the western world. Kroton spawned many victors during the ancient Olympics and other Panhellenic Games. Amongst the most famous were Milo of Croton, who won six wrestling events in six Olympics in a row, along with seven events in the Pythian Games, nine events in the Nemean Games and ten events in the Isthmian Games and also Astylos of Croton, who won six running events in three Olympics in a row. Through Alcmaeon of Croton (a philosopher and medical theorist) and Pythagoras (a mathematician and philosopher), who moved to Kroton in 530 BC, the city became a renowned center of philosophy, science and medicine. The Greeks of Sybaris created "Intellectual Property." Sybaris benefited from "vinoducts" which were a series of pipes that carried wine to the homes of its citizens. The Sybarite founded at least 20 other colonies, including Poseidonia (Paestum in Latin, on the Tyrrhenian coast of Lucania), Laüs (on the border with Lucania) and Scidrus (on the Lucanian coast in the Gulf of Taranto). Locri was renowned for being the town where Zaleucus created the first Western Greek law, the "Locrian Code" and the birthplace of ancient epigrammist and poet Nossis.

The Itali were the first established people of Calabria. Later came the Bruttii from Lucania. These occupied Calabria and called it Bruttium. The Bruttii were very advanced culturally. The Greek cities of Calabria came under the pressure from these Lucanians, an Oscan people who lived in the present day region of Basilicata. They conquered the north of Calabria and pushed further south, taking over part of the interior, probably after they defeated the Thurians near Laus in 390 BC. A few decades later Calabria came under pressure from the Bruttii. They were Lucanian slaves and other fugitives who were seeking refuge on the steep mountains of Calabria. Their name was Lucanian and meant rebels. They took advantage of the weakening of the Greek cites caused by wars between them. They took over Hipponium, Terina and Thurii. They helped the Lucanians to fight Alexander of Epirus (334–32 BC), who had come to the aid of Tarentum (in Apulia), which was also pressured by the Lucanians. After this, Agathocles of Syracuse ravaged the coast of Calabria with his fleet, took Hipponium and forced the Bruttii into unfavourable peace terms. However, they soon seized Hipponium again. After Agathloces' death in 289 BC the Lucanians and Bruttii pushed into the territory of Thurii and ravaged it. The city sent envoys to Rome to ask for help in 285 BC and 282 BC. On the second occasion, the Romans sent forces to garrison the city. This was part of the episode which sparked the Pyrrhic war.

During the Pyrrhic War (280–275 BC) the Lucanians and Bruttii sided with Pyrrhus and provided contingents which fought with his army. When Pyrrhus landed in Italy the people of Rhegion were worried about their safety and asked Rome for protection. The Romans sent soldiers from Campania to garrison the city. Coveting the wealth of the city, the soldiers killed its prominent men, sent away the rest and seized their property. The Romans could not do much about it because they were engaged in the war. A few years after the end of the war, in 271 BC, the Romans retook the city, arrested the soldiers and took them to Rome, where they were executed. After Pyrrhus was defeated, to avoid Roman revenge, the Bruttii submitted willingly and gave up half of the Sila, a mountainous plateau which was valuable for its pitch and timber. The timber here was sold all over Italy and the resin of the area was of the highest quality.

During the Second Punic War (218–201 BC) the Bruttii allied with Hannibal, who sent Hanno, one of his commanders, to Calabria. Hanno marched towards Capua (in Campania) with Bruttian soldiers to take them to Hannibal's headquarters there twice, but he was defeated on both occasions. When his campaign in Italy came to a dead end, Hannibal took refuge in Calabria, whose steep mountains provided protection against the Roman legions. He set up his headquarters in Kroton and stayed there for four years until he was recalled to Carthage. The Romans fought a battle with him near Kroton, but its details are unknown. Many Calabrian cities surrendered. Calabria was put under a military commander. Nearly a decade after the war, the Romans set up colonies in Calabria: at Tempsa and Kroton (Croto in Latin) in 194 BC, Copiae in the territory of Thurii (Thurium in Latin) in 193 BC, and Vibo Valentia in the territory of Hipponion in 192 BC. The Romans called Calabria Bruttium. Later, during the reign of Augustus it became part of the third region of Italy, the 'Regio III Lucania et Brettium.

Middle Ages
After sacking Rome in 410, Alaric I (King of the Visigoths) went to Calabria with the intention of sailing to Africa. He contracted malaria and died in Cosentia (Cosenza), probably of fever. Legend has it that he along with the treasure of Rome were buried under the bed of the River Busento. With the fall of the western part of the Roman Empire in 476, Italy was taken over by the Germanic chieftain Odoacer and later became part of the Ostrogothic Kingdom in 489. The Ostrogothic kings ruled officially as Magistri Militum of the Byzantine Emperors and all government and administrative positions were held by the Romans while all primary laws were legislated by the Byzantine Emperor. Therefore, during the sixth century, under the Ostrogoths' rule, Romans could still be at the center of government and cultural life, such as the Roman Cassiodorus who, like Boethius and Symmachus, emerged as one of the most prominent men of his time. He was an administrator, politician, scholar and historian who was born in Scylletium (near Catanzaro). He spent most of his career trying to bridge the divides of East and West, Greek and Latin cultures, Romans and Goths, and official Christianity and Arian Christianity, which was the form of Christianity of the Ostrogoths and which had earlier been banned. He set up his Vivarium (monastery) in Scylletium. He oversaw the collation of three editions of the Bible in Latin. Seeing the practicality of uniting all the books of the Bible in one volume, he was the first who produced Latin Bibles in single volumes. The most well-known of them was the Codex Grandior which was the ancestor of all modern western Bibles.

Cassiodorus was at the heart of the administration of the Ostrogothic kingdom. Theodoric made him quaestor sacri palatii (quaestor of the sacred palace, the senior legal authority) in 507, governor of Lucania and Bruttium, consul in 514 and magister officiorum (master of offices, one of the most senior administrative officials) in 523. He was praetorian prefect (chief minister) under the successors of Theodoric: under Athalaric (Theodoric's grandson, reigned 526–34) in 533 and, between 535 and 537, under Theodahad (Theodoric's nephew, reigned 534–36) and Witiges (Theodoric's grandson-in-law, reigned, 536–40). The major works of Cassiodorus, besides the mentioned bibles, were the Historia Gothorum, a history of the Goths, the Variae and account of his administrative career and the Institutiones divinarum et saecularium litterarum, an introduction to the study of the sacred scriptures and the liberal arts which was very influential in the Middle Ages.

Byzantine (Eastern Roman) Emperor Justinian I, retook Italy from the Ostrogoths between 535 and 556. They soon lost much of Italy to the Lombards between 568 and 590, but retained the south for around 500 years until 1059–1071, where they thrived and where the Greek language was the official and vernacular language. In Calabria and towns such as Stilo and Rossano and San Demetrio Corone achieved great religious status. From the 7th Century many monasteries were built in the Amendolea and Stilaro Valleys and Stilo was the destination of hermits and Basilian monks. Many Byzantine churches are still seen in the region. The 10th-century church in Rossano, together with the "twin" church of Sant'Adriano in San Demetrio Corone (foundation 955, rebuilt by the Normans on the, still, visible foundations of the previous Byzantine church), are considered between the best preserved Byzantine churches in Italy. They were both built by St. Nilus the Younger as a retreat for the monks who lived in the tufa grottos underneath. The present name of Calabria comes from the duchy of Calabria.

Around the year 800, Saracens began invading the shores of Calabria, attempting to wrest control of the area from the Byzantines. This group of Arabs had already been successful in Sicily and knew that Calabria was another key spot. The people of Calabria retreated into the mountains for safety. Although the Arabs never really got a stronghold on the whole of Calabria, they did control some villages while enhancing trade relations with the eastern world. In 918, Saracens captured Reggio (which was renamed Rivà), holding many of its inhabitants to ransom or keeping them prisoners as slaves. It is during this time of Arab invasions that many staples of today's Calabrian cuisine came into fashion: Citrus fruits and eggplants for example. Exotic spices such as cloves and nutmeg were also introduced.

Under the Byzantine dominion, between the end of the 9th and the beginning of the 10th century, Calabria was one of the first regions of Italy to introduce silk production to Europe.
According to André Guillou, mulberry trees for the production of raw silk were introduced to southern Italy by the Byzantines at the end of the ninth century.
Around 1050 the theme of Calabria had 24,000, mulberry trees cultivated for their foliage, and their number tended to expand.

At the beginning of the tenth century (circa 903), the city of Catanzaro was occupied by the Muslim Saracens, who founded an emirate and took the Arab name of قطنصار – QaTanSáar. An Arab presence is evidenced by findings at an eighth-century necropolis which had items with Arabic inscriptions.
Around the year 1050, Catanzaro rebelled against Saracen dominance and returned to a brief period of Byzantine control.

In the 1060s the Normans, under the leadership of Robert Guiscard's brother, Roger I of Sicily, established a presence in this borderland, and organized a government modeled on the Eastern Roman Empire and was run by the local magnates of Calabria. Of note is that the Normans established their presence here, in southern Italy (namely Calabria), 6 years prior to their conquest of England, (see The Battle of Hastings). The purpose of this strategic presence in Calabria was to lay the foundations for the Crusades 30 years later, and for the creation of two Kingdoms: the Kingship of Jerusalem, and the Kingdom of Sicily. Ships would sail from Calabria to the Holy Land. This made Calabria one of the richest regions in Europe as princes from the noble families of England, France and other regions, constructed secondary residences and palaces here, on their way to the Holy Land. Guiscard's son Bohemond, who was born in San Marco Argentano, would be one of the leaders in the first crusade. Of particular note is the Via Francigena, an ancient pilgrim route that goes from Canterbury to Rome and southern Italy, reaching Calabria, Basilicata and Apulia, where the crusaders lived, prayed and trained, respectively.

In 1098, Roger I of Sicily was named the equivalent of an apostolic legate by Pope Urban II and later his son Roger II of Sicily became the first King of Sicily and formed what would become the Kingdom of Sicily which lasted nearly 700 years. Under the Normans Southern Italy was united as one region and started a feudal system of land ownership in which the Normans were made lords of the land while peasants performed all the work on the land.

In 1147, Roger II of Sicily attacked Corinth and Thebes, two important centres of Byzantine silk production, capturing the weavers and their equipment and establishing his own silkworks in Calabria, thereby causing the Norman silk industry to flourish.

In 1194, Frederick II, took control of the region, after inheriting the Kingdom from his mother Constance, Queen of Sicily. He created a kingdom that blended cultures, philosophy and customs and would build several castles while fortifying existing ones which the Normans previously constructed. After the death of Frederick II in 1250, Calabria was controlled by the Capetian House of Anjou, under the rule of Charles d’Anjou after being granted the crown of the Sicilian Kingdom by Pope Clement IV. In 1282, under Charles d’Anjou, Calabria became a domain of the newly created Kingdom of Naples, and no longer of the Kingdom of Sicily, after he lost Sicily due to the rebellion of the Sicilian Vespers. During the 14th century, would emerge Barlaam of Seminara who would be Petrarch's Greek teacher and his disciple Leonzio Pilato, who would translate Homer's works for Giovanni Boccaccio.

While the cultivation of mulberry was moving first steps in Northern Italy, silk made in Calabria reached the peak of 50% of the whole Italian/European production. As the cultivation of mulberry was difficult in Northern and Continental Europe, merchants and operators used to purchase in Calabria raw materials to finish the products and resell them for a better price. The Genoese silk artisans used fine Calabrian silk for the production of velvets.
In particular, the silk of Catanzaro supplied almost all of Europe and was sold in a large market fair to Spanish, Venetian, Genoese, Florentine and Dutch merchants.
Catanzaro became the lace capital of Europe with a large silkworm breeding facility that produced all the laces and linens used in the Vatican. The city was known for its fabrication of silks, velvets, damasks and brocades.

Early modern period
In the XV century, Catanzaro was exporting both its silk cloth and its technical skills to neighbouring Sicily. By the middle of the century, silk spinning was taking place in Catanzaro, on a large scale.

In 1442 the Aragonese took control under Alfonso V of Aragon who became ruler under the Crown of Aragon. In 1501 Calabria came under the control of Ferdinand II of Aragon, whose wife Queen Isabella of Castille is famed for sponsoring the first voyage of Christopher Columbus in 1492. Calabria suffered greatly under Aragonese rule with heavy taxes, feuding landlords, starvation and sickness. After a brief period in the early 1700s under the Austrian Habsburgs, Calabria came into the control of the Spanish Bourbons in 1735. It was during the 16th century that Calabria would contribute to modern world history with the creation of the Gregorian calendar by the Calabrian doctor and astronomer Luigi Lilio.

In 1466, King Louis XI decided to develop a national silk industry in Lyon and called a large number of Italian workers, mainly from Calabria. The fame of the master weavers of Catanzaro spread throughout France and they were invited to Lyon to teach the techniques of weaving. In 1470, one of these weavers, known in France as Jean Le Calabrais, invented the first prototype of a Jacquard-type loom. He introduced a new kind of machine which was able to work the yarns faster and more precisely. Over the years, improvements to the loom were ongoing.

Charles V of Spain formally recognized the growth of the silk industry of Catanzaro in 1519 by allowing the city to establish a consulate of the silk craft, charged with regulating and check in the various stages of a production that flourished throughout the sixteenth century. At the moment of the creation of its guild, the city declared that it had over 500 looms. By 1660, when the town had about 16,000 inhabitants, its silk industry kept 1,000 looms, and at least 5,000 people, busy. The silk textiles of Catanzaro were not only sold at the kingdom's markets, they were also exported to Venice, France, Spain and England.

In the 16th century, Calabria was characterized by a strong demographic and economic development, mainly due to the increasing demand of silk products and the simultaneous growth of prices, and became one of the most important Mediterranean markets for silk.

In 1563 philosopher and natural scientist Bernardino Telesio wrote "On the Nature of Things according to their Own Principles" and pioneered early modern empiricism. He would also influence the works of Francis Bacon, René Descartes, Giordano Bruno, Tommaso Campanella and Thomas Hobbes. In 1602 philosopher and poet Tommaso Campanella wrote his most famous work, "The City of the Sun" and would later defend Galileo Galilei during his first trial with his work "A Defense of Galileo", which was written in 1616 and published in 1622. In 1613 philosopher and economist Antonio Serra wrote "A Short Treatise on the Wealth and Poverty of Nations" and was a pioneer in the Mercantilist tradition.

During the 17th century silk production in Calabria begin to suffer by the strong competition of new-raising competitors in Italian Peninsula and Europe (France), but also the increasing import from Ottoman Empire and Persia.

Foundation of the historical Italo-Albanian College and Library in 1732 by Pope Clement XII transferred from San Benedetto Ullano to San Demetrio Corone in 1794. 

In 1783 a series of earthquakes across Calabria caused around 50,000 deaths and much damage to property, so that many of the buildings in the region were rebuilt after this date.

At the end of the 18th century the French took control and in 1808 Napoleon Bonaparte gave the Kingdom of Naples to his brother-in-law Joachim Murat. Murat controlled the kingdom until the return of the Bourbons in 1815. The population of Calabria in 1844 was 1,074,558.

Calabria experienced a series of peasant revolts as part of the European Revolutions of 1848. This set the stage for the eventual unification with the rest of Italy in 1861, when the Kingdom of Naples was brought into the union by Giuseppe Garibaldi. The unification was orchestrated by Great Britain in an attempt to nationalize the production of sulfur from the two volcanoes located in Naples and Sicily respectively. The Aspromonte was the scene of a famous battle of the unification of Italy. During the late 19th or early 20th century, pianist and composer Alfonso Rendano invented the "Third Pedal", which augmented the interpretative resources of the piano.

The ancient Greek colonies from Naples and to the south, had been completely Latinized, but from the fifth century AD onward Greeks had once again emigrated there when pressed out of their homeland by invasions. This Greek Diaspora allowed the ancient Greek dialects to continue in Southern Italy, much in the same way that the Italian Diaspora allowed long-lost dialects from Italy to thrive in countries where Italians emigrated to. Greek texts were also valued in monasteries and places of learning. However it was Charlemagne in the 8th century, who made Latin the 'official' language of study and communication for Europe. For the sake of uniformity, he supplanted much of the Greek spoken, read or taught in Europe. It was through language (Latin) and education (Latin texts) that Charlemagne united Europe.

During the 13th century a French chronicler who traveled through Calabria stated that "the peasants of Calabria spoke nothing but Greek" given he had traveled to areas where Greek was still available. But the educated classes spoke Italian. Indeed, formal Italian has been taught in schools throughout Italy for nearly two centuries, causing the ancient languages and dialects to continually disappear, much to the chagrin of the cultural community. These lost dialects continue to thrive to this day in North America and Australia, places where Italians emigrated to, on account of the Diaspora.

Modern era
On 19 August 1860, Calabria was invaded from Sicily by Giuseppe Garibaldi and his Redshirts as part of the Expedition of the Thousand. Through King Francesco II of Naples had dispatched 16,000 soldiers to stop the Redshirts, who numbered about 3,500, after a token battle at Reggio Calabria won by the Redshirts, all resistance ceased and Garibaldi was welcomed as a liberator from the oppressive rule of the Bourbons wherever he went in Calabria. Calabria together with the rest of the Kingdom of Naples was incorporated in 1861 into the Kingdom of Italy. Garibaldi planned to complete the Risorgimento by invading Rome, still ruled by the Pope protected by a French garrison, and began with semi-official encouragement to raise an army. Subsequently, King Victor Emmanuel II decided the possibility of war with France was too dangerous, and on 29 August 1862 Garibaldi's base in the Calabrian town of Aspromonte was attacked by the Regio Esercito. The Battle of Aspromonte ended with the Redshirts defeated with several being executed after surrendering while Garibaldi was badly wounded.  

In the newly unified Kingdom of Italy, there were significant differences in level of economic development between the Nord (north) of Italy and the Mezzogiorno (the south of Italy). Calabria together with the rest of the Mezzogiorno was neglected under the Kingdom of Italy with the general feeling in Rome being that the region was hopelessly backward and poor. In the late 19th century about 70% of the population of the Mezzogiorno were illiterate as the government never invested in education for the south. Owing to the Roman Question, until 1903 the Roman Catholic Church had prohibited on the pain of excommunication Catholic men from voting in Italian elections (Italian women were not granted the right to vote until 1946). As the devoutly Catholic population of Calabria tended to boycott elections, the deputies who were elected from the region were the products of the clientistic system, representing the interests of the land-owning aristocracy. In common with the deputies from other regions of the Mezzogiorno, they voted against more money for education under the grounds that an educated population would demand changes that would threaten the power of the traditional elite. Owing to a weak state, society in Calabria came to be dominated in the late 19th century by an organised crime group known as 'Ndrangheta which like the Mafia in Sicily and the Camorra in Campania formed a "parallel state" that co-existed alongside the Italian state. Between 1901 and 1914 Calabrians began emigrating in large numbers, mostly for North America and South America, with the peak year being 1905 with 62,690. 

On 28 December 1908, Calabria together with Sicily was devastated by an earthquake and then by a tsunami caused by the earthquake, causing about 80, 000 deaths. Within hours of the disaster, ships of the British and Russian navies had arrived on the coast to assist the survivors, but it took the Regia Marina two days to send a relief expedition from Naples. The bumbling and ineffectual response of the Italian authorities to the disaster caused by feuding officials who did not wish to co-operate with each other contributed to the high death toll as it took weeks for aid to reach some villages and caused much resentment in Calabria. To offset widespread criticism that the northern-dominated government in Rome did not care about the people of Calabria, King Victor Emmanuel III personally took over the relief operation and toured the destroyed villages of Calabria, which won the House of Savoy a measure of popularity in the region. Most notably, after the king took charge of the relief efforts, the feuding between officials ceased and relief aid was delivered with considerably more efficiency, winning Victor Emmanuel the gratitude of the Calabrians.  

Fascism was not popular in Calabria. In December 1924 when a false rumor spread in Reggio Calabria that Benito Mussolini had resigned as Prime Minister because of the Matteotti affair, joyous celebrations took place in the city that lasted all night. In the morning, the people of Reggio Calabria learned that Mussolini was still prime minister, but several Fascist officials were dismissed for not suppressing the celebrations. The landed aristocracy and gentry of Calabria, through generally not ideologically committed to Fascism, saw the Fascist regime as a force for order and social stability, and supported the dictatorship. Likewise, the prefects and the policemen of Calabria were conservatives who saw themselves as serving King Victor Emmanuel III first and Mussolini second, but supported Fascism as preferable to Socialism and Communism and persecuted anti-Fascists. Traditional elites in Calabria joined the Fascist Party to pursue their own interests, and local branches of Fascist Party were characterized by much jostling for power and influence between elite families. Under the Fascist regime, several concentration camps were built in Calabria and used to imprison foreigners whose presence in Italy was considered undesirable, such as Chinese immigrants and foreign Jews (though not Italian Jews) together with members of the Roma (Gypsy) minority, whose nomadic lifestyle was viewed as anti-social. The camps which operated from 1938 to 1943 were not death camps, and the majority of those imprisoned survived, but conditions were harsh for the imprisoned.

On 3 September 1943, British and Canadian troops of the British 8th Army landed in Calabria in Operation Baytown, marking the first time that the Allies landed on the mainland of Italy. However, the landings in Calabria were a feint and the main Allied blow came on 8 September 1943 with the landing of the American 5th Army at Salerno in Campania that was intended to cut off Axis forces in the Mezzogiorno. The Germans anticipated that the Allies would land at Salerno, and as a consequence, there was relatively little fighting in Calabria. The Italian troops in Calabria mostly surrendered to the advancing 5th British Division and the 1st Canadian Division while there were relatively few German forces in the region to oppose their advance. The main obstacle to the advancing Anglo-Canadian troops turned out to be the trail of destruction left by German combat engineers who systematically blew up bridges and destroyed roads and railroads as the Wehrmacht retreated north. On the same day the Americans landed at Salerno, General Dwight Eisenhower announced on the radio the Armistice of Cassibile that had been signed on 3 September, and with the announcement of the armistice all Italian resistance ceased. The Germans committed most of their forces in the Mezzogiorno to the Battle of Salerno with the aim of driving the Allies back into the sea and pulled their remaining forces out of Calabria to send them to Salerno. Under the Allied occupation, some Fascists in Calabria waged a terrorist struggle on behalf of the Salo republic, though significantly many of the Fascists tended to be from well-off families concerned about the possibility of social reforms that might weaken their power and only a minority such as Prince Valerio Pignatelli were ideological Fascists. In June 1944, celebrations in Reggio Calabria over the news of the liberation of Rome were disturbed by local Fascists.  

The British historian Jonathan Dunnage wrote that there was an "institutional continuity" between the civil servants of the Liberal, Fascist and post-Fascist eras in Calabria as each change of regime saw the bureaucrats of the region adjust to whatever regime was in power in Rome and there was no purge of civil servants either after 1922 or 1943. The "institutional continuity" of the bureaucracy of Calabria were committed to preserving the social structure. On 2 June 1946 referendum, Calabria like the rest of the Mezzogiorno voted solidly to retain the monarchy. The clientistic political system in Calabria under which elite families handed out patronage to their supporters and used violence against their opponents, which was the prevailing norm in the Liberal and Fascist eras continued after 1945. During the Second World War, the already low living standards of Calabria declined further and the region was notorious as one of the most violent and lawless areas of Italy. Attempts by the peasants of Calabria to take over the land owned by the elite were usually resisted by the authorities. On 28 October 1949 in Melissa the police opened fire on peasants who had seized the land of a local baron, killing three men who were shot in the back as they attempted to flee. Between 1949 and 1966 another wave of migration took place with the peak year of migration being 1957 with some 38, 090 Calabrians leaving that year.    

Under the First Republic, starting in the 1960s, investment plans were launched under which Italian state sponsored industrialisation and attempted to improve the infrastructure of Calabria by building modern roads, railroads, ports, etc. The plan was a notable failure with the infrastructure projects going wildly over-budget and taking far longer to complete then scheduled; for an example, construction started on the A3 highway in 1964 intended to link Reggio Calabria to Salerno, which was as of 2016 still unfinished. The failure to complete the A3 highway after 52 years of effort is regarded as a scandal in Italy, and many parts of Calabria were described as an "industrial graveyard" full of the closed down steel mills and chemical plants that all went bankrupt. From July 1970 to February 1971 the Reggio revolt took place as the decision to make Catanzaro instead of Reggio the regional capital prompted massive protests. The compromise decision to make Catanzaro the executive capital and Reggio the administrative capital has led to a bloated and inefficient administration. The high unemployment rate in Calabria has led to extensive migration and Calabria's biggest export has been its own people as Calabrians have moved to either other parts of Italy and abroad, especially to the United States, Canada and Argentina, to seek a better life. In 2016, it was estimated that 18% of the people born in Calabria were living abroad.  

Early on Sunday, February 26th, 2023, a wooden sailing boat carrying migrants to Europe crashed against the rocks and "sank in rough seas before dawn near Steccato di Cutro, a seaside resort on the eastern coast of Calabria." At least 59 people died, including 12 children. The vessel sailed from Turkey, carrying people from Afghanistan, Iran, Pakistan, and Somalia. Italian Prime Minister Giorgia Meloni, elected in 2022 partly on a pledge to stem the flow of migrants into Italy, expressed "deep sorrow" for the incident, blaming the deaths on traffickers.

Economy 
The Gross Domestic Product (GDP) of Calabria is subdivided as follows: service industry (28.94%), financial activities and real estate (21.09%), trade, tourism, transportation and communication (19.39%), taxation (11.49%), manufacturing (8.77%), construction (6.19%) and agriculture (4.13%). GDP per capita is 2.34 times less and unemployment is 4 times higher than in Lombardy. Calabria's economy is still based mainly on agriculture.

The economy of the region is strongly affected by the presence of the 'Ndrangheta (the local Mafia syndicate).

Agriculture 

Calabria is agriculturally rich, with the Italy's second highest number of organic farmers after Sicily.

The red onion of Tropea is cultivated during summer period on the Tyrrhenian coast of central Calabria. It has been awarded with the protected geographical indication (PGI).

The olive tree represents 29.6% of utilised agricultural area (UAA) and approximately 70% of tree crops. Olive tree cultivation extends from coastal lowland areas to hilly and lower mountainous areas.
The region is the second-highest for olive oil production with Carolea, Ogliarola, and Saracena olives as the main regional varieties.

In Calabria, there are 3 PDO oils: "Bruzio" in the province of Cosenza, "Lametia" in the area of Lamezia Terme and the more recent "Alto Crotonese". In addition to DOP oils there are also PGI oils. The production area of "Olio di Calabria" PGI includes the entire territory of the Calabria region. The production is made exclusively from indigenous olives.

Calabria produces about a quarter of Italy's citrus fruit. The contribution of this region to growing citrus fruit in Italy can be attributed mainly to clementines, oranges, mandarins and lemons. Calabria is by far the country's most important clementine-growing region, which account for about 62% (16,164 ha) of the Italian surface dedicated to its cultivation and 69% (437,800 tons) of the total production. Clementina di Calabria is the PGI variety grown in the Calabria region. Also chinotto is cultivated and used to produce carbonated soft drink with the same name.
 

Minor fruits such as bergamot and citron and lemon-citron hybrids are found exclusively in Calabria. The south coast of the region produces 90% of the world's bergamots, with a huge industry built around the extraction of bergamot oil. According to Harvard Atlas of Economic Complexity, last year with Italian net export of bergamot oil was 2009 in value of $253,000, after that between 2010 and 2018 was no export of it. The Bergamot orange has been intensively cultivated since the 18th century, but only in the coastal area nearby to Reggio, where geological and weather conditions are optimal. The Chabad Hasidic dynasty have a preference to take citrons ("Etrog") from this region for the Sukkot festival.

There is special research Experimental Station for the Industry of the Essential oils and Citrus products in Reggio di Calabria.

The province of Cosenza represents an important area for figs growing belonging to cultivar "Dottato" that is used to produce the quality-branded dried figs "Fichi di Cosenza" PDO (Protected Designation of Origin). The anona cherimoya, a plant of tropical origin cultivated in Europe only in Reggio di Calabria and Spain.

In the province of Catanzaro, between San Floro and Cortale, the ancient tradition of sericulture is still kept alive, thanks to young generations.

Calabria is the largest producer of porcini mushrooms in Italy, thanks to the heavily wooded forests of the mountains ranges of Pollino, Sila, Serre and Aspromonte. Chestnut production is also widespread in the Calabrian mountains. But not only porcini mushrooms, there is other popular red pine mushroom or rosito.

Peaches and nectarines from Calabria have greatly improved in terms of flavour, quality, safety and service. A part of the production is sold on the domestic market, mainly to retailers. The remaining is exported to Northern Europe, mainly Scandinavia and Germany.

The region boasts a very ancient tradition in the cultivation and production of liquorice. The eighty percent of the national production is concentrated in this region.

Calabria has long coast and produce some distinctive fish products:

Manufacturing 
Food and textile industries are the most developed and vibrant. Within the industrial sector, manufacturing contributes to a gross value added of 7.2%. In the manufacturing sector the main branches are foodstuff, beverage and tobacco with a contribution to the sector very close to the national average.
Over the recent decades some petrochemical, engineering and chemical industries have emerged, within the areas of Crotone, Vibo Valentia and Reggio Calabria.

The province of Catanzaro boasts a great tradition in the textile manufacturing, especially silk. Recently, several young people have given new life to this activity, developing green and sustainable economy projects. In fact, among the municipalities of Girifalco, San Floro and Cortale, sericulture is still practiced, the breeding of silkworms combined with the cultivation of mulberry trees.

Tiriolo and Badolato are known above all for the manufacturing of the "vancale", the typical Calabrian shawl, made of wool or silk, worn by women in ancient times on traditional costumes during the dance of tarantella, or as an ornamental decoration of the houses.
Typical in Tiriolo is also the manufacturing of carpets, linen and broom fibers, bobbin lace making, embroidery, precious ceramics, furnishing objects and artistic sculptures. The artistic production of weaving is also active in other centers such as in Platania and Petrizzi where once hemp fibers were also produced.

In Soveria Mannelli, Lanificio Leo, the oldest textile factory in Calabria founded in 1873, is still active. The factory still retains majestic and evocative tools dating back to the late nineteenth century.

The traditional production of artistic ceramics dating back to the Magna Graecia period is handed down in the ancient towns of Squillace and Seminara.

The small town of Serrastretta, a green village in the woods of Presila, is known for its wood production, in particular for its chairs characterized by a very original straw.

There is a plant of Hitachi Rail Italy in Reggio di Calabria, which manufactures railcars of regional trains like Vivalto.

Tourism 

Tourism in Calabria has increased over the years. The main tourist attractions are the coastline and the mountains. The coastline alternates between rugged cliffs and sandy beaches, and is sparsely interrupted by development when compared to other European seaside destinations. The sea around Calabria is clear, and there is a good level of tourist accommodation. The poet Gabriele D'Annunzio called the coast facing Sicily near Reggio Calabria "... the most beautiful kilometer in Italy" (il più bel chilometro d'Italia). The primary mountain tourist draws are Aspromonte and La Sila, with its national park and lakes. Some other prominent destinations include:
Reggio Calabria is on the strait between the mainland and Sicily, the largest and oldest city in Calabria dating from the 8th century BC, known for its panoramic seaside with botanical gardens between the art nouveau buildings and the beaches, and its 3,000 years of history with its Aragonese Castle and the Museo Nazionale della Magna Grecia where the Riace bronzes (Bronzi di Riace) are located.
Cosenza, birthplace of scientist and philosopher Bernardino Telesio and seat of the Cosentian Academy, known for its cultural institutions, the old quarter, a Hohenstaufen Castle, an open-air museum and an 11th-century Romanesque-Gothic Cathedral. On 12 October 2011, the Cathedral of Cosenza received UNESCO World Heritage status for being "Heritage Witness to a Culture of Peace". This is the first award given by UNESCO to the region of Calabria.
Scilla, on the Tyrrhenian Sea, "pearl" of the "Violet Coast", has a delightful panorama and is the site of some of Homer's tales.
Tropea, on the Tyrrhenian Sea coast, is home to a dramatic seaside beach, and the Santa Maria dell'Isola sanctuary. It is also renowned for its sweet red onions (mainly produced in Ricadi).
Capo Vaticano, on the Tyrrhenian Sea, is a wide bathing place near Tropea.
Gerace, near Locri, is a medieval city with a Norman Castle and Norman Cathedral.
Squillace, a seaside resort and important archaeological site. Nearby is the birthplace of Cassiodorus.
Stilo, the birthplace of philosopher Tommaso Campanella, with its Norman Castle and Byzantine church, the Cattolica.
Pizzo Calabro, on the Tyrrhenian Sea coast, known for its ice cream called "Tartufo". Interesting places in Pizzo are Piazza Repubblica and the Aragonese castle where Murat was shot.
Paola, a town situated on the Tyrrhenian Sea coast, renowned for being the birthplace of St. Francis of Paola, patron saint of Calabria and Italian sailors, and for the old Franciscan sanctuary built during the last hundred years of the Middle Ages by the will of St. Francis.
Sibari, on the Ionian coast, a village situated near the archaeological site of the ancient city of Sybaris, a Greek colony of the 8th century BC.
Lamezia Terme, the main transportation hub of the region with its international airport which links it to many destinations in Europe plus Canada and Israel and the train station. Several are the historical sights of the city, like the Norman-Swabian castle, the Jewish historical quarter and the Casa del Libro Antico (House of the Ancient Book) where books from the 16th to the 19th centuries, as well as old globes and ancient maps reproduction are well preserved and available to be seen by the public.
Catanzaro, an important silk center since the time of the Byzantines, is located at the centre of the narrowest point of Italy, from where the Ionian Sea and Tyrrhenian Sea are both visible, but not from Catanzaro. Of note are the well-known one-arch bridge (Viaduct Morandi-Bisantis, one of the tallest in Europe), the cathedral (rebuilt after World War II bombing), the castle, the promenade on the Ionian sea, the park of biodiversity and the archaeological park.
Soverato on the Ionian Sea, also known as the "Pearl" of the Ionian Sea. Especially renowned for its beaches, boardwalk and nightlife.
Badolato near Soverato is a well-preserved medieval hilltop village with 13 churches. It was selected as one of the 1000 marvels of Italy to mark the anniversary of the unification of Italy.
Nicotera on the Tyrrhenian Sea, is a small medieval town with an ancient Ruffo's castle.
Ancient temples of the Roman gods on the sun-kissed hills of Catanzaro still stand as others are swept beneath the earth. Many excavations are going on along the east coast, digging up what seems to be an ancient burial ground.
Samo, a village on the foot of the Aspromonte, is well known for its spring water and ruins of the old village destroyed in the 1908 Messina earthquake.
Mammola, art center, tourist and gastronomic, has an ancient history. The old town, with its small houses attached to each other, the ancient churches and noble palaces. Of particular interest is the Museum Park Santa Barbara, a place of art and cultural events of many international artists and the Shrine of St. Nicodemo of the 10th century, in the highlands of Limina. Its gastronomy with the "Stocco" typical of Mammola, cooked in various ways, other typical products are smoked ricotta and goat cheese, salami pepper and wild fennel, bread "pizza" (corn bread) and wheat bread baked in a wood oven.
Praia a Mare on the Tyrrhenian Sea, is a well-known tourist city, thanks to the Isola di Dino and the seaside beach.
Spilinga is known for its spicy pork pâté, 'Nduja.

Calabria attracts year-round tourism, offering both summer and winter activities, in addition to its cultural, historical, artistic heritage, it has an abundance of protected natural habitats and 'green' zones. The  of its coast make Calabria a tourist destination during the summer. The low industrial development and the lack of major cities in much of its territory have allowed the maintenance of indigenous marine life.

The most sought-after seaside destinations are: Tropea, Pizzo Calabro, Capo Vaticano, Reggio Calabria, Soverato, Scilla, Scalea, Sellia Marina, Montepaone, Montauro, Copanello (comune of Staletti), Tonnara di Palmi, Diamante, Paola, Fiumefreddo Bruzio, Amantea, Praia a Mare, Belvedere Marittimo, Roseto Capo Spulico, Corigliano Calabro, Cirò Marina, Amendolara, Roccella Ionica, Bagnara Calabra, Nicotera, Cariati, Zambrone, Isola di Capo Rizzuto, Caminia (comune of Staletti), Siderno, Parghelia, Ricadi and San Nicola Arcella.

In addition to the coastal tourist destinations, the interior of Calabria is rich in history, traditions, art and culture. Cosenza is among the most important cultural cities of Calabria, with a rich historical and artistic patrimony. Medieval castles, towers, churches, monasteries and other French castles and structures from the Norman to the Aragonese periods are common elements in both the interior and coastline of Calabria.

The mountains offer skiing and other winter activities: Sila, Pollino and Aspromonte are three national parks that offer facilities for winter sports, especially in the towns of Camigliatello (comune of Spezzano della Sila), Lorica (comune of San Giovanni in Fiore), Gambarie and Monte Sant'Elia (comune of Palmi).

Unemployment rate 
The unemployment rate stood at 20.1% in 2020 and was the highest in Italy and one of the highest inside the European Union.

Infrastructure and transport

Shipping and ports 

The main Calabrian ports are in Reggio Calabria and in Gioia Tauro.

In a 2006 report, Italian investigators estimated that 80% of Europe's cocaine arrived from Colombia via Gioia Tauro's docks. The port is also involved in the illegal arms trafficking. These activities are controlled by the 'Ndrangheta criminal syndicate.

Motorways and rail 
The region is served by three heavily used roads: two national highways along the coasts (the SS18 between Naples and Reggio Calabria and the SS106 between Reggio Calabria and Taranto) and the A2 motorway, which links Salerno to Reggio Calabria, passing by Cosenza along the old inland route. Building this motorway took 55 years and was extremely over budget due to organized crime infiltration.

There is high-speed rail on Calabria's Tyrrhenian Coast with the Frecciargento (Silver Arrow) offering a route from Rome to Reggio Calabria. There are also many ferries connecting Calabria with Sicily through the Strait of Sicily with the main one being from Villa San Giovanni to Messina.

Air travel 
In Calabria there are two main airports: the Reggio Calabria Airport, a few kilometres from Reggio Calabria's city centre, built in 1939 was Calabria's first airport; the Lamezia Terme Airport is currently the first airport in Calabria for number of passengers per year.

Demographics 

The following is a list of Calabrian municipalities with a population of over 20,000:
 Reggio Calabria – 186,013
 Catanzaro – 93,265
 Corigliano-Rossano – 77,220
 Lamezia Terme – 71,123
 Cosenza – 69,827
 Crotone – 61,529
 Rende – 35,352
 Vibo Valentia – 33,857
 Castrovillari – 22,518
 Acri – 21,263
 Montalto Uffugo – 20,553

Government and politics

Sister jurisdictions 
 Burwood, Australia.
 State of West Virginia, United States.

Administrative divisions 

Calabria is divided into five provinces:

Healthcare system
Because of their debts, since 2009 they were administered by an extraordinary commissioner appointed by the central Italian government. In 2012, the Calabria Region unified 11 Azienda Sanitaria Locale into 5 provincial units, when came into force a regional law approved on 11 May 2007. In July 2021, the Constitutional Court of Italy censored the decree of law with the appointing of a new commissioner, because it didn't provide a new administrative structure to solve the long-time crisis of the Calabria's regional healthcare system. It has been seen as an unavoidable step to return to an ordinary and cost-effective administration at a regional level, as it is provided by the Italian Constitution.

Language 

Although the official national language of Calabria has been Standard Italian since before unification in 1861, Calabria has dialects that have been spoken in the region for centuries. The Calabrian language is a direct derivative of Latin. Most linguists divide the various dialects into two different language groups. In the northern area of the region, the Calabrian dialects are considered part of the Neapolitan language and are grouped as Northern Calabrian. In the rest of the region, the Calabrian dialects are often grouped as Central and Southern Calabrian, and are considered part of the Sicilian language. However, in Guardia Piemontese, as well as some quarters of Reggio Calabria, a variety of Occitan called Gardiol can also be found. In addition, since Calabria was once ruled by the French and Spanish, some Calabrian dialects exhibit Spanish and French influences.
Another important linguistic minority, in the nine towns of Bovesìa in the province of Reggio Calabria, speaks a derivative of ancient Greek called Griko, a remnant of Byzantine rule and ancient Magna Graecia.

Religion 

The majority of Calabrians are Roman Catholic. Historically, Calabrians were Greek Orthodox, and in 732 the dioceses of Southern Italy were even moved to the jurisdiction of the Patriarch of Constantinople. There are also communities of Evangelicals in the region. Calabria has also been called "The Land of Saints" as the region was the birthplace of many saints spanning nearly 2,000 years. The most famous saint in Calabria and also the patron saint of the region is St. Francis of Paola. Calabria also has another patron saint called Saint Bruno of Cologne who was the founder of the Carthusian Order. Saint Bruno would build the charterhouse of Serra San Bruno, a town which bears his name, in 1095 and later die there in 1101.

Even though it is currently a very small community, there has been a long history of the presence of Jews in Calabria. The Jews have had a presence in the region for at least 1600 years and possibly as much as 2300 years. Calabrian Jews have had notably influence on many areas of Jewish life and culture. Although virtually identical to the Jews of Sicily, the Jews of Calabria are considered a distinct Jewish population due to historical and geographic considerations. There is a small community of Italian Anusim who have resumed the Jewish faith.

It is important to highlight the presence of Calabrians in Renaissance humanism and in the Renaissance. Indeed, the Hellenistics in this period frequently came from Calabria maybe because of the Greek influence. The rediscovery of Ancient Greek was very difficult because this language had been almost forgotten. In this period the presence of Calabrian humanists or refugees from Constantinople was fundamental. The study of Ancient Greek, in this period, was mainly a work of two monks of the monastery of Seminara: Barlaam, bishop of Gerace, and his disciple, Leonzio Pilato. Leonzio Pilato, in particular, was a Calabrian born near Reggio Calabria. He was an important teacher of Ancient Greek and translator, and he helped Giovanni Boccaccio in the translations of Homer's works.

Cuisine 

The cuisine is a typical southern Italian Mediterranean cuisine with a balance between meat-based dishes (pork, lamb, goat), vegetables (especially eggplant), and fish. Pasta (as in Central Italy and the rest of Southern Italy) is also very important in Calabria. In contrast to most other Italian regions, Calabrians have traditionally placed an emphasis on the preservation of their food and packing vegetables and meats in olive oil, and on making sausages and cold cuts (soppressata, 'nduja, capocollo). Along the coast fish is cured, especially swordfish, sardines (sardelle rosamarina) and cod (baccalà). Local desserts are typically fried, honey-sweetened pastries such as cudduraci, nacatole, scalille or scalidde, or baked biscotti-type treats such as nzudda.

Some local specialties include Caciocavallo cheese, cipolla rossa di Tropea (red onion), frìttuli and curcùci (fried pork), liquorice (liquirizia), lagane e cicciari (a pasta dish with chickpeas), pecorino crotonese (sheep cheese), and pignolata.

Some vineyards have origins dating back to the ancient Greek colonists. The best known DOC wines are Cirò (Province of Crotone) and Donnici (Province of Cosenza). 3% of the total annual production qualifies as DOC. Important grape varieties are the red Gaglioppo and white Greco. Many producers are resurrecting local, ancient grape varieties which have been around for as long as 3000 years.

Transportation

Airports 
Lamezia Terme International Airport
Reggio Calabria Airport
Crotone Airport (summer only)

Seaports 
Port of Gioia Tauro (the busiest container port in Italy and 9th-busiest in Europe)
Port of Reggio Calabria
Port of Vibo Valentia
Port of Villa San Giovanni
Port of Corigliano Calabro
Port of Crotone

Bridges 
Calabria has the two highest bridges in Italy:
Italia Viaduct
Sfalassa Viaduct (also the highest and longest span frame bridge in the world)

Universities 
There are 3 public universities in the region of Calabria
University of Calabria (Cosenza)
Magna Graecia University (Catanzaro)
Mediterranea University of Reggio Calabria

There is also the private University for Foreigners "Dante Alighieri" in Reggio Calabria.

Notable people

See also 
1783 Calabrian earthquakes
1905 Calabria earthquake
1908 Messina earthquake
Arbëreshë people
Duke of Calabria
Bruttians
Griko people
Magna Graecia
Oenotrians
Strait of Messina Bridge
Theme of Sicily

Notes

References

Further reading 
Dal Lago, Enrico, and Rick Halpern, eds. The American South and the Italian Mezzogiorno: Essays in Comparative History (2002) 
Dunston, Lara, and Terry Carter. Travellers Calabria (Travellers – Thomas Cook) (2009), guidebook
Moe, Nelson. The View from Vesuvius: Italian Culture and the Southern Question (2002)
Schneider, Jane. Italy's 'Southern Question': Orientalism in One Country (1998)

External links 

Official website of the region
Official website of tourism 

 
Peninsulas of Italy

Regions of Italy
NUTS 2 statistical regions of the European Union
Wine regions of Italy